Carolina Dynamo was an American women’s soccer team, founded in 2008, which was a member of the United Soccer Leagues USL W-League. The Dynamo played in the Atlantic Division of the Eastern Conference. The team folded after the 2008 season.

The Dynamo played home games at Macpherson Stadium in the city of Greensboro, North Carolina. The club's colors was red and white.

The team was a sister organization of the men's Carolina Dynamo team, which plays in the USL Premier Development League.

2008 roster

Former notable players
  Kendall Fletcher
  Mara Whichard 
  Jennifer Marsh

Year-by-year

External links
Carolina Dynamo

North Carolina Fusion U23
USL W-League (1995–2015) teams
Women's soccer clubs in the United States
2008 disestablishments in North Carolina
Association football clubs disestablished in 2008
Women's sports in North Carolina